Un Autre Blanc is a studio album by Mali singer-songwriter Salif Keita. It was released in October 2018 under Naïve Records.

Track listing

References

2018 albums
Salif Keita albums
Naïve Records albums